This is a list of mosques in Oman.

See also
 Islam in Oman
 Lists of mosques

References

 
Oman
Mosques